Jenah (also Romanized as Jenāḩ, Janāḩ, and Jonāḩ; also known as Janna, Chāleh, and Farāmarzān) is a city and capital of Jenah District, in Bastak County, Hormozgan Province, Iran. At the 2006 census, its population was 5,636, in 1,322 families.

References

External links 

 Janah online

Cities in Hormozgan Province
Populated places in Bastak County